Acton is a small community located in the southeast corner of Marion County, Indiana, United States, and has been included in the city of Indianapolis under the Unigov legislation passed by the Indiana General Assembly in 1969. The community was named for an early settler, General Acton.

History
The community's original name was Farmersville. The town was renamed in 1854 when the U.S. Postal Service discovered there was already a town named Farmersville in Posey County, Indiana.

From 1859 to 1905, a group of Methodists operated the Acton Camp Ground on  just north of the town, at the corner of Southport and Acton roads. An agreement with the Indianapolis and Cincinnati Railroad provided good access to the camp grounds. Fire destroyed the camp buildings in 1864, but the association rebuilt them. Another fire in 1905 again destroyed the camp, but this time efforts to raise funds to rebuild fell short, and the land was sold.

Actress Marjorie Main was born in Acton in 1890. Born Mary Tomlinson, Marjorie Main, moved from Acton to Elkhart, Indiana as a child 

In the summer of 1980, a motorcyclist was struck by lightning while passing through Acton. When attempts by paramedics were unsuccessful in reviving the motorist, both the paramedics and witnesses claim a lady dressed in black and holding a bible, emerged and was able to revive the motorist by striking the motorist on the chest with a bible while speaking in tongues. Some believe the lady in black was the spirit of one of the attendees from the former Acton Camp ground.

Notable people 
 Marjorie Main,  Oscar-nominated American character actress

References

Neighborhoods in Indianapolis
Indianapolis metropolitan area
Populated places established in 1852
1852 establishments in Indiana